Siam General Aviation Company Limited was an airline in Thailand.  Previously operated as an arm for Nok Air under the brand Nok Mini, the company ended their partnership in March 2014.  SGA were in talks to be acquired by Thai AirAsia but this fell through and the airline is no longer operating.

History
Siam General Aviation Co., Ltd., based in Bangkok.  Its president is Jain Charnnarong.  It started operations in October 2002.  The company also is an authorised service center for Cessna aircraft in Thailand.  In November 2004, it launched daily Bangkok-Hua Hin flights.

The company started accepting Internet bookings in 2005, and in 2006 it received an Airline Operation Certificate and commenced flight operation as a scheduled airline.  In February 2007, it started services from a second hub at Chiang Mai International Airport (ex-primary hub), servicing routes to Pai and Nan.

In 2014, SGA terminated their partnership with Nok Air, effective March 30 of the same year.  Its president Jain Charnnarong is stepping down citing health concerns, and talks for a Thai AirAsia acquisition failed. Some of the 7 routes previously served under Nok Mini brand are being picked up by Nok Air, operating with their fleet of ATR 72-500 and Boeing 737-800.

Destinations 
During its existence, SGA flew to the following destinations:

 Thailand
 Bangkok — Don Mueang International Airport (Hub)
 Buri Ram — Buri Ram Airport
 Chiang Mai — Chiang Mai International Airport
 Hua Hin — Hua Hin Airport
 Loei — Loei Airport
 Mae Hong Son — Mae Hong Son Airport
 Mae Sot — Mae Sot Airport
 Nan — Nan Nakhon Airport
 Phrae — Phrae Airport
 Ranong — Ranong Airport
 Roi Et — Roi Et Airport
 Udon Thani — Udon Thani International Airport

 Myanmar
 Mawlamyine — Mawlamyine Airport
 Yangon — Yangon International Airport

Fleet
All fleet were disposed or sold by June 2014

References

External links

SGA fleet 

Defunct airlines of Thailand
Airlines established in 2002
Airlines disestablished in 2014
Thai companies established in 2002
2014 disestablishments in Thailand